CLG Na Rossa is a Gaelic football only GAA club based in Leitir, County Donegal, Ireland. The club fields both men's and ladies' teams at underage to senior level.

History
Na Rossa have won the Donegal Junior A Football Championship once (1982) and the Donegal Intermediate Football Championship twice (1989 and 1999).

Declan Bonner became player-manager with Na Rossa at the age of 23, his first managerial appointment. He did so having gone to the United States in 1988 and, having returned late, Donegal manager Tom Conaghan did not include him in the county panel for the following year. Bonner led Na Rossa to the 1989 Donegal Intermediate Football Championship, while also playing for them. Bonner's brothers Sean, Michael and Donal were also part of that Na Rossa team, while his brother Aidan — a minor — was a substitute. Brian McEniff took over as Donegal manager again at the end of 1989. McEniff recalled Bonner to the county team. Bonner would not manage Na Rossa again for some time.

Bonner went on to play in McEniff's 1992 All-Ireland Senior Football Championship-winning team, scoring four points in the final.

Notable players

 Declan Bonner — 1992 All-Ireland SFC winning player; 2018 and 2019 Ulster SFC winning manager

 Martin Caulfield — county player
 Carl McHugh — later a professional soccer player

Managers

Honours
 Donegal Intermediate Football Championship: 1989, 1999
 Donegal Junior Football Championship: 1982

References

External links
 Profile at RTÉ Sport

Gaelic football clubs in County Donegal
Gaelic games clubs in County Donegal
The Rosses